Burton TMD was a traction maintenance depot located in Burton upon Trent, Staffordshire, England.  The depot was situated on the Midland Main Line and was near Burton-on-Trent station. 

The depot code was BU.

History 
Before its closure in 1968, Class 02, 03, 08 and 25 locomotives could be seen at the depot.

References 
 

1840 establishments in England
1968 disestablishments in England
 Railway depots in England
Rail transport in Staffordshire